Yvon Chomet (born 20 August 1945) is a French former professional footballer who played as defender and midfielder. He notably made 130 appearances for Monaco.

Honours 
Monaco

 Coupe de France runner-up: 1973–74

Notes

References 

1945 births
Living people
Martiniquais footballers
French footballers
French people of Martiniquais descent
Black French sportspeople
Association football defenders
Association football midfielders
Assaut de Saint-Pierre players
Pays d'Aix FC players
AS Monaco FC players
Ligue 2 players
Ligue 1 players
French Division 3 (1971–1993) players